Digitivalva eglanteriella is a moth of the family Acrolepiidae. It is found in France, Spain and Portugal and on Corsica and Crete.

The larvae feed on Helichrysum italicum. They bore in young shoots of their host plant, from where leaves are mined. The larvae can be found from autumn to April.

References

Acrolepiidae
Moths described in 1855
Moths of Europe